The 2013–14 Churchill Brothers S.C. season will be the club's seventh season in the I-League, the top division of Indian football. Churchill Brothers enter this season as the reigning I-League champions after winning the 2012–13 I-League.

I-League

Matches

Table

Competitions

Federation Cup

Group stage

Semifinal

Final

AFC Cup

Group stage

First-team squad

Transfers

In

Out

Player statistics

References

Churchill Brothers FC Goa seasons
Churchill Brothers